Le Val-Doré is a commune in the department of Eure, northern France. The municipality was established on 1 January 2018 by merger of the former communes of Orvaux (the seat), Le Fresne and Le Mesnil-Hardray.

See also 
Communes of the Eure department

References 

Communes of Eure